Atopodontus adriaensi is a species of upside-down catfish endemic to Gabon where it occurs in rapids of the Ivindo, Okano, Ngounié and the Nyanga Rivers. This species grows to a length of  SL. This species is the only described member of its genus.

Etymology
The catfish is named in honor of biologist Dominique Adriaens (b. 1970), of the University of Ghent, who brought the existence of this species to the authors’ attention.

References

Mochokidae
Fish described in 2008
Catfish of Africa
Fish of Gabon
Endemic fauna of Gabon